June Millington (born April 14, 1948) is a Filipina-American guitarist, songwriter, producer, educator, and actress. She was the co-founder and lead guitarist of the all-female rock band Fanny, which was active from 1970 to 1974. Millington has been called "a godmother of women's music", and the co-founder and artistic director of the Institute for the Musical Arts (IMA) in Goshen, Massachusetts.

Early life
June Elizabeth Millington was born in Manila, the Philippines, on April 14, 1948, the eldest of the seven children of Filipina socialite "Yola" Yolanda Leonor Limjoco Millington (born February 10, 1922, in Lian, Batangas, the Philippines; died December 19, 2002, in California, U.S.), and former United States Navy Lt. Commander John "Jack" Howard Millington (born September 18, 1915, in Burlington, Vermont; died June 24, 1980, in Bristol, Vermont). He had graduated from the United States Naval Academy in 1939, and was a son of Professor Howard G. Millington, a noted folklorist. June Millington's parents were married in Manila in May 1947, and divorced in California in March 1970. Millington is the older sister of bassist Jean Y. Millington Adamian (born May 25, 1949, in Manila), Richard J. Millington, Stephen H. Millington, James E. Millington, David S. Millington, and Sylvia F. G. Millington Lyons.

Philippines
Jack and Yola Millington and their children lived luxuriously  with Yola's parents Angel Limjoco and Felisa Limjoco (née Lejano) in various Manila locations in until they moved to the United States in 1961, including at 56 R. Pascual Street, San Juan (then part of Rizal province); in the Wack Wack Golf and Country Club in Mandaluyong; near the old American School in Pasay; and on N. Domingo Street, San Juan; and for several months just before they emigrated at the Howell Compound in Quezon City. Additionally, during 1953, Millington and her family lived for a year in Baguio with her grandparents.

At the age of eight, Millington began playing piano to entertain her family, and later listened to music on the radio and attempted to play along on ukulele. Her family encouraged her to sing and play ukulele at gatherings.

Millington and her siblings attended The American School, then located in Donada Street in Pasay in Manila, where she later recalled: "the racism we encountered at the American School was crushing." By 1960 Millington transferred to the Assumption Convent school located in Makati, Metro Manila. Early in 1961, when Millington was in the seventh grade, she heard a girl play the guitar, which jump-started her interest in the instrument.

On her 13th birthday, Millington was given a small, hand-made, mother-of-pearl inlaid guitar by her mother.

United States
Three weeks later, in May 1961, the Millington family left the Philippines for the United States on the SS President Cleveland. While on board ship, Millington switched from playing the ukulele to acoustic guitar. On June 22, 1961, the Millington family arrived in the U.S., and then settled in Sacramento, California.

Millington recalled: "We always felt like "other", never quite fitting in, both in Manila and Sacramento. Being both biracial and bicultural was a really really tough slot in the '50s into the '60s, our formative teenage years." In an attempt to become more popular and make friends, in 1962, Millington and her sister Jean wrote their first song "Angel in White", followed by "Miss Wallflower '62", which they sang with two other girls on their ukuleles at their junior high school variety show. Millington recalled that afterwards, "Kids started coming up to us and telling us they liked it. So it dawned on us this was a way to make friends." In 1962, Millington and her sister Jean began to sing folk songs together as an acoustic duo at hootenannies and similar events, including the songs of Peter, Paul and Mary and other artists featured on the television program Hootenanny.

Later in 1962, Millington and her sister Jean enrolled in the class of 1966 at C. K. McClatchy High School. During 1963, Millington was a member of a YWCA conference group of senior high school students chosen to visit the California State Legislature. While students at McClatchy, the Millington sisters formed a band with Zenaida "Zenny" Prodon (born June 1949) (Class of 1965), an American Field Service exchange student from Meycauayan Institute High School (now Meycauayan College) in Meycauayan, Bulacan, Philippines.

Musical career

1965–1968: The Svelts
With her mother's assistance, but against her father's wishes, in late 1964, Millington switched from acoustic guitar to electric guitar and bass after a girl from another school who played drums [Kathy Terry] asked if Millington and her sister Jean would like to start a band. Millington recalled in 2013:

We were like, "Yeah, okay!" My dad took me to a pawn shop and got me a Sears Roebuck guitar with a little matching amp. That was my first rig–a complete and total thrill. Jean and I flipped a coin to see who would play bass in the band. (laughs) I won, so I got to stay on guitar. We learned to play by listening to the radio and by hanging out with boys who were in bands. We were 15 or 16 at the time.

By early 1965, Millington and her sister Jean formed The Svelts, an all-female rock band, with June on rhythm guitar, Jean on bass, Kathy Terry on drums, and Cathy Carter on guitar. According to Millington, the band's name, "came from a word my brother had just learned in school. To be svelte: thin, lithe. It sounded like what we wanted to be, kinda classy!"  The Svelts rehearsed initially in Terry's living room in Sacramento. Managed and promoted by Richard "Dick" Leventon (born January 4, 1938; died September 30, 1991), The Svelts performed at sock hops, air force bases, and frat parties and gradually built a following. In November 2012, Millington recalled:

Was it hard? Hell, yeah. Girls weren't supposed to go electric, so the resistance was incredible at first. Was it fun? You bet. By keeping our grades up at school, we began to lead successful double lives as Philippine-American girls by day, budding rockers at night, except we didn't do rock as much as we did girl group songs and Motown, which meant "He's So Fine" and "Heatwave," with "The Night Before" and "You Really Got Me" thrown in. If people danced to it, we did it. They were all great songs to cut your teeth on and learn compositionally.

Later, Terry was replaced on drums by Filipino American Brie Berry (born August 9, 1949), who was a student at Folsom High School (class of 1967). Before their senior year, Millington and her sister Jean performed during the summer of 1965 as a duo. In September 1965, they copyrighted their song "Footloose and Fancy-Free".

After graduation from high school in 1966, Millington enrolled at the University of California, Davis, where, hoping to become a surgeon, she majored in premedical studies with a minor in music. However, after a year, Millington decided to suspend her studies to focus on her musical career.

After a number of personnel changes, including five different drummers, the Millington sisters were joined in 1968 by lead guitarist Adrienne "Addie" Lee Clement (from the Palo Alto band California Girls), recent graduate of Cubberley High School; and drummer Alice Monroe de Buhr (born September 4, 1949, in Mason City, Iowa), who had moved to California at age 17, after the divorce of her parents, in search of fame and fortune. In this four-piece configuration, the Svelts gigged around the West in a renovated Greyhound bus, mainly playing cover songs. By early 1967, the Svelts (Millington, Wendy Haas, Brie Berry, and Jean Millington) had a band house in Los Altos, where they lived and rehearsed.

In 1967, Millington enrolled at the University of California, Berkeley, where she continued her premed studies for two quarters. However, after playing in clubs on the US West Coast and Nevada, Berry, who had married Michael Brandt, left the band because of pregnancy, and subsequently became the mother of Brandi Angela Brandt (born November 2, 1968, in Santa Clara, California).

1968–1969: Wild Honey
While Millington attended classes, Clement and de Buhr toured as the Svelts, but later decided to rename the band Wild Honey, and gigged briefly in the Midwest before returning to California. In 1968, Clement and de Buhr invited Millington and her sister Jean to join Wild Honey. Consequently, Millington decided to terminate her university studies to become a full-time musician. Wild Honey played folk songs, Motown covers, and some of their own songs, and played with Creedence Clearwater Revival, the Youngbloods, and the Turtles at fairs and private parties, and auditioned at the Fillmore West with the Doors.

Hoping to secure a recording contract, in April 1969, Wild Honey relocated from Sacramento to Los Angeles to "either sign with a label or go back to school." However, frustrated by "playing all nasty inappropriate little gigs, suffering all the demeaning little scams", and by a lack of success or respect in the male-dominated rock scene, Wild Honey decided to disband after one final open mic appearance at Doug Weston's Troubadour Club in West Hollywood in 1969. They were spotted at this gig by the secretary of producer Richard Perry, who had been searching for an all-female rock band to mentor. Perry convinced Warner Bros. to sign the band to their Reprise Records subsidiary. After Addie Clement left the band, Millington became the lead guitarist, taking a year to learn to play lead guitar. While searching for a fourth member for the band, Wild Honey recorded in various studios with an assortment of women, including former Svelts drummer Brie Berry Brandt.

1970–1973: Fanny

Later in 1969, the band was renamed Fanny to denote a female spirit, although it was a deliberate double entendre. Before recording their first album, In January 1970 keyboardist Nicole "Nickey" Barclay, was added to the Fanny lineup. Millington was the lead guitarist in Fanny with her sister Jean on bass, de Buhr on drums, and Barclay on keyboards. The band lived in a Spanish style house they christened "Fanny Hill" on Marmont Lane overlooking the Sunset Strip in West Hollywood. However, in March 1970, Barclay left Fanny to be a member of Joe Cocker's hastily organized Mad Dogs & Englishmen seven-week tour of the U.S., but rejoined Fanny reluctantly after that tour concluded in May 1970. Their first big gig as Fanny was at the Santa Monica Civic Auditorium with the Kinks and Procol Harum.

Fanny was the first all-female rock band to release an album on a major label. They eventually released five albums and achieved two top-40 singles on the Billboard Hot 100. The band has long been considered pioneers and are highly respected by later all-women rock groups like The Go-Go's and The Runaways. In 1999 Fanny fan David Bowie said that Fanny was "extraordinary... they're as important as anybody else who's ever been, ever; it just wasn't their time."

Millington and the other members of Fanny also worked as session musicians, most notably in June 1971 on Barbra Streisand's album Barbra Joan Streisand that was produced by Perry. They appeared on national TV programs, including The Tonight Show with Johnny Carson, The Midnight Special, Don Kirshner Presents, and the Sonny & Cher Comedy Hour. Additionally, they appeared on The Kenny Rogers Show in Canada, the BBC's  Old Grey Whistle Test, and Germany's Beat-Club.

Because of tensions within the band, including frequent disagreements with Barclay over their conflicting musical preferences, and soon after having a nervous breakdown "because of the pressures of touring, recording, coping with success, maintaining success, and maintaining a certain image in the boy-defined rock world", Millington left Fanny after their fourth album Mothers Pride was released in February 1973. Millington was replaced as lead guitarist by Patti Quatro (born Patricia Helen Quatrocchio on March 10, 1948, in Detroit, Michigan), sister of Suzi Quatro, and former member of all-female bands The Pleasure Seekers and Cradle in March 1974. Thirty years after her breakdown, Millington summarized: "Instead of carrying it all, I just fell apart." In 2008, Millington revealed in an interview:

I was just so intent on my mission to do music come hell or high water that I was missing a lot of the subtleties of life—which is why I'd left Hollywood. I had intuited that I was in trouble and I had to leave—which was very difficult. It was hard to leave that whole scene, it was hard to leave rock 'n' roll in that way, it was hard to leave the band that we had worked so hard to establish, it was hard to leave my sister. But I was falling apart.

1973–1975: Smiles
After she left Fanny in 1973, Millington moved to Peconic, New York, on Long Island, and soon after to her recently purchased farm on Mead Mountain, Woodstock, New York, to focus on her songwriting and spiritual development. Soon after, Millington started a solo career in New York, where she eventually became the lover of musician Jacqueline "Jackie" Robbins (born circa 1950), who played bass guitar, cello, and bass. Millington and Robbins played together, but she also regularly played with other bands such as Randall's Island and Sha-Na-Na. Millington recalled in November 2012:

I jammed with whomever whenever I could, as that was part of what I'd felt was missing from my life. Most people don't realize how many women players there were in New York at that time. There were a lot, funky too, and serious about playing; they'd be practicing all the time.

About 1973, Millington formed a band called Smiles in New York, which also included percussionist Padi Macheta. In 1975, Millington worked in New Orleans as a guest musician on the Allen Toussaint-produced album Ain't No Stopping Us Now by the all-female jazz fusion  band Isis that had been founded by Ginger Bianco and Carol MacDonald, who had both been in pioneer all-female band Goldie & the Gingerbreads.

Women's Music
After a period of rest and renewal, in 1975, Millington began a musical association with Cris Williamson through her friendship with Robbins. Through Williamson's influence, Millington became involved in the burgeoning Women's Music Movement (often code for Lesbian Music). In the winter of 1975 both Millington and Robbins traveled to Los Angeles to play on Williamson's  The Changer and the Changed: A Record of the Times, which would become the definitive work of the genre. Millington headlined major Women's Music festivals for decades.

1975–1976: Fanny/ L.A. All-Stars
Due to the chart success of Fanny's song "Butter Boy", which became their biggest single, reaching number 29 on the Billboard Hot 100 on April 5, 1975, the Millington sisters put together a new line-up of Fanny for a short tour, which also included former Svelts drummer Brie Howard, keyboardist Wendy Haas (born August 9, 1949) (formerly of pioneer all-female band The Freudian Slips of Atherton, California), and percussionist Padi Macheta. This incarnation of Fanny played none of the older Fanny songs. This group ultimately morphed into a new all-women band called the L.A. All-Stars, which, by 1976, had generated some interest from record labels (including Arista), but with the stipulation that the band tour as Fanny and play only old Fanny songs, which Millington opposed. In 1976, Millington and the members of the L.A. All-Stars provided backing vocals on Lee Garrett's song "You're My Everything" that reached number 15 in the UK.

In 1976, Millington was part of Cris Williamson's national tour, and toured with Williamson over the next three years, and helped produce seven albums for Williamson. Since then, Millington also produced records for Tret Fure, Meg Christian, Holly Near, Mary Watkins, Bitch and Animal, John Simon, Diane Lincoln, Melanie DeMore, Jamie Anderson, Dorothy Dittrich, Ferron, Ruth Huber, Linq, and Joel Zoss. Additionally, Millington was the audio engineer on records by DeMore, Williamson, Anderson, Dittrich, Sharon Knight, Alice Di Micele, Ferron, Fure, Near, Bitch & Animal, Linq, and Zoss.

1977: Millington
In 1977, June and Jean Millington reunited as a duo called Millington, and recorded Ladies on the Stage (1978) for United Artists. June Millington was also featured on the 1977 compilation album Lesbian Concentrate: A Lesbianthology of Songs and Poems (Olivia Records LF 915) that was a response to the antigay Save Our Children campaign of Anita Bryant. In 1978, Millington and Robbins collaborated with Williamson on the album Live Dreams, which was a live album of recorded performances, featuring Millington on drums and guitars and Robbins on bass and cello.

1980–1988: Fabulous Records
By August 1981, Millington had moved to the Bay Area,<ref>Jack McDonough, Underground Women Moving Up", Billboard (August 1981):44.</ref> and had separated from Robbins, with Robbins briefly becoming the partner of Cris Williamson.City Arts Monthly (City Celebration, 1981):80. In 1981 Millington started her own record label, Fabulous Records, a subsidiary of Olivia Records. Through most of the 1980s, Millington toured as a solo artist, promoting her albums released on Fabulous Records: Heartsong (1981), Running (1983), and One World, One Heart (1988). In early 1980, Millington started working on her debut solo album, Heartsong, a soft-rock folk album, and toured to support the album.  In 1981 Millington produced activist Holly Near's "Fire in the Rain" album for Redwood Records.

After the collapse of a relationship, in 1982, Millington moved to Milwaukee, Wisconsin, where she wrote the songs for her Running album. At that time, Millington was studying Tibetan Buddhism. Millington recorded Running in San Francisco at the Wally Heider Studios on Hyde Street, with her sister Jean playing on it. Earl Slick, Jean's then husband played on the title cut.

In 1984, Millington moved briefly to Kurtistown, Hawaii, where her youngest brother David lived, and wrote songs for her album One World, One Heart, which was released in 1988. In an effort to deepen her understanding of Tibetan Buddhism, in the autumn of 1984 Millington started following the Dalai Lama around. During that same time period, Millington got together with her current partner, Ann F. Hackler, and moved to the Amherst, Massachusetts area, where Hackler was director of the Women's Center at Hampshire College. Millington recalled in November 2012:

I lived with her at the college for two years and learned a lot about institutional thinking.

Millington's 1993 solo release, Ticket to Wonderful, synthesized a 30-year exploration of musical styles and sounds – which began with folk and rock and journeyed through funk, reggae, salsa, pop, and world beat.

1999–2006: The Slammin' Babes
By 1999, the Millingtons formed a six-person band, the Slammin' Babes, that released an album Melting Pot in August 2001. The Slammin' Babes continued to perform until mid-2006.

Later years
Millington has been highly regarded for her work on behalf of women musicians and the LGBT community. Millington indicates that when she was 20 years old she knew she was a lesbian, and that while "everybody" associated with the band Fanny knew, at that time "you didn't talk about it", and it was not featured in the promotion of Fanny.Gay & Lesbian Biography, ed. Michael J. Tyrkus (St. James Press, 1997):328. Since 1984 Millington has been in a domestic partnership with education activist Ann F. Hackler (born May 2, 1956), who had been the director of the Women's Center at Hampshire College in Amherst, Massachusetts.

In 1986, Millington and Hackler founded the Institute for the Musical Arts (IMA) in Bodega, California. The IMA received its nonprofit status in 1987, and operated its studio and programs from the historic Old Creamery in Bodega until 2001, when a 25-acre permanent property was purchased in Goshen, Massachusetts.Elizabeth Hinkle-Turner, Women Composers and Music Technology in the United States: Crossing the Line(Ashgate Publishing, Ltd., 2006):213. The IMA's nonprofit mission is to support women and girls in music and music-related businesses. Rooted in the legacy of progressive equal rights movements, IMA's development is guided by the visions, needs, and concerns of women from a diversity of backgrounds. Its programs including a Rock 'n Roll Camp for Girls, and workshops on vocal and instrumental instruction, album production and recording techniques, lyric and music composition, and booking, promotion, and entertainment law.

In 2002, Millington was featured in and was also the associate director of Radical Harmonies, a documentary about the history of women's music directed by Dee Mosbacher. Millington was co-composer (with Lee Madeloni) for the 2009 documentary The Heretics, the inside story of a pivotal force in the "second wave" of the Women's Movement written and directed by Joan Braderman. In February 2013, Millington and fellow Fanny alumni Alice de Buhr and Jean Millington re-recorded two Fanny classic songs for a documentary entitled, Feminist: Stories from the Women's Liberation 1963–1970. Millington is featured in the upcoming documentary She Rocks! about great women guitarists (including Orianthi, Jennifer Batten, Patti and Suzi Quatro, June and Jean Millington, Vicki Peterson of The Bangles, Kaki King, Earl Slick, Bibi McGill, Jordin Sparks, Tish Ciravolo, and Beth Marlis). Millington plays Jane Wong, bassist and singer in an all-female band in the 2015 independent feature film "SUGAR!", which was written by Leora Kalish and directed by Shari Berman. Starring Alice Ripley and Robert Clohessy, the film tells the story of the housewife of a Republican candidate for U.S. Senate, who secretly forms an all-women rock band.Sugar, The Film. Official SUGAR! film website  Dec. 5, 2014.

Millington continues to produce music. Play Like a Girl, Millington and her sister Jean's most recent album was released in August 2011 on Millington's label Fabulous Records. Millington explained its purpose:

When we started out in 1965, we 'played like a girl'. With this album, we're reclaiming that phrase and making it a statement of power and vision. It's a gift to still be rockin' out, while teaching the next generation how to find their own voices through music.

By February 2011, Millington was artist-in-residence at the University of Western Ontario in London, Ontario. Since 2011, Millington has been completing her autobiography, Land of a Thousand Bridges, that is funded through Kickstarter, with all proceeds to support the work of the IMA .

Awards and recognition
In 1996 the Audio Engineering Society honored Millington with its Lifetime Achievement award, and also presented Millington the first AES Women in Audio 'Granny' award along with Suzanne Ciani. In 2000, the Bay Area Career Women gave her their LAVA award for being a "legend of women's music".  In 2005, Millington received the Outmusic Heritage Award and in 2007 she, along with the other members of Fanny, received the ROCKRGRL Women of Valor Award from magazine founder Carla DeSantis Black, Berklee College of Music and ROCKRGRL magazine.

In February 2016, there was a pop-up gallery multimedia retrospective of Millington's life and career called "Play Like a Girl". Hosted in an empty storefront in downtown Northampton, Massachusetts, this gallery featured photographs, instruments, records, and other rock n' roll memorabilia from throughout Millington's life. This retrospective was inspired, in part, by the May 2015 publication of Millington's autobiography, Land of a Thousand Bridges: Island Girl in a Rock and Roll World.

Album discography

Singles discography

Fanny
 "Ladies' Choice" (June & Jean Millington)/ "New Day" (June & Jean Millington) (1970; Reprise Records 0901)
 "Nowhere To Run" (Holland-Dozier-Holland) / "One Step At a Time" (Armstead, Ashford & Simpson) (1970; Reprise Records 0938)
 "Changing Horses" (Barclay) / "Conversation With a Cop" (Barclay) (1971; Reprise Records 0963)
 "Conversations With a Cop" (Barclay) / "Come and Hold Me" (June & Jean Millington) (1971; Reprise Records 963)
 "Charity Ball" (De Buhr, June & Jean Millington) / "Place in the Country" (Barclay) (US: 1971; Reprise Records 1033) (UK: 1971; Reprise Records K 14109) US Charts #40
 "Ain't That Peculiar" (Moore, Robinson, Tarplin, White) / "Think About the Children" (Millington) (US: 1972; Reprise Records REP 1080) (UK: 1972; Reprise Records K 14165) (Germany: 1972: Reprise Records REP 14165)
 "Young & Dumb" (Ike Turner) / "Knock On My Door" (Barclay) (US: 1973; Reprise Records REP 1119) (UK: 1973 Reprise Records K14217) (Germany: 1972 Reprise Records REP 14 207)
 "I Sold My Heart to the Junkman" (Jimmie Thomas) (UK: 1973; Reprise Records)
 "All Mine" (Jean & June Millington) / "I Need You Need Me" (Barclay) (1973 Reprise Records REP 1148)
 "Last Night I Had a Dream" (Randy Newman) / "Beside Myself" (Barclay & Millington) (1973 Reprise Records REP 1162)
 "Summer Song" (Millington) / "Borrowed Time" (Barclay) (UK: January 1973; Reprise Records K 14220)

Millington
 "Young and in Love" (Millington) (US: 1977; United Artists Records UAXW 1045)
 "Ladies on the Stage" (Millington) / "Fantasy" (Millington) (US: 1978; United Artists Records) (UK; 1979; United Artists Records UP 36367)

Videography
 Associate director and interviewee, Radical Harmonies (Woman Vision 2002; Wolfe Video 2004); directed by Dee Mosbacher).
 She Rocks (October 2013)

Film
 SUGAR! (independent feature film, 2015) – Millington plays Jane Wong, bassist and singer in an all-female band called SUGAR!

References

Other references
"FTV 435 Fanny – the All-female Rock ‘n’ Roll Band 1971 radio interview
JazzWax, http://www.JazzWax.com/2011/08/millingtons-play-like-a-girl.html
Wall Street Journal: "The Pioneer Women of Rock 'n' Roll."
http://wfmu.org/playlists/shows/41571
http://www.valleyadvocate.com/article.cfm?aid=13953 
"Olivia Records: Women Making Music Together" article in Yoga Journal, describing Millington's "spiritual journey" that is expressed on her Olivia Records album Heartsong''.
Interview with Millington in Backstage pass: interviews with women in music
"DOCUMENTING LESBIAN LIVES: Student Oral History Project" , with separate interviews with Millington and her partner Ann Hackler. Located at the Sophia Smith Collection, Women's History Archives, Smith College.

External links
  archived February 10, 2014
 
 
 The Institute for the Musical Arts
 Fanny: Godmothers of Chick Rock

1948 births
American women singers
Filipino emigrants to the United States
American musicians of Filipino descent
American rock musicians
Lesbian singers
Lesbian songwriters
American lesbian musicians
American LGBT songwriters
American LGBT singers
Filipino lesbian musicians
Filipino LGBT singers
Filipino LGBT songwriters
American LGBT people of Asian descent
Living people
Musicians from Manila
American rock guitarists
American women singer-songwriters
Lead guitarists
Women's music
American Buddhists
Filipino Buddhists
LGBT Buddhists
LGBT record producers
20th-century American guitarists
20th-century Buddhists
21st-century Buddhists
American women record producers
Fanny (band) members
Converts to Buddhism
20th-century American women guitarists
20th-century LGBT people
21st-century LGBT people